or  (Briséïs, or the Lovers of Corinth) is an operatic  by Emmanuel Chabrier with libretto by Catulle Mendès and Ephraïm Mikaël after Goethe's .

Composition and performance history
It seems likely that Catulle Mendès (who had already provided the libretto for Gwendoline and words for Chabrier's songs "Chanson de Jeanne" and "Lied"), saw potential for an opera in Ephraïm Mikhaël and Bernard Lazare's 'dramatic legend' , and suggested the project to Chabrier. Chabrier worked on the opera from May 1888 until 1893 when his ill-health (paralysis in the late stages of syphilis) prevented any further progress.

The first act (which lasts around 75 minutes) was in a finished enough state by the end of June 1890 for Chabrier to play it to Mendès – the orchestration was then completed by the end of September of that year.
In 1894 Chabrier asked Vincent d'Indy to complete the work, but it was too difficult to piece together the sketches. Due to illness, Chabrier only completed the first act (of the three projected), which was premiered at a Chabrier memorial concert in Paris on 13 January 1897, conducted by Charles Lamoureux.
Chabrier's heirs also asked other composers – including Debussy, Enescu and Ravel – to try to complete it.

The first staging of act 1 took place at the Neues Königliches Opernhaus in Berlin on 14 January 1899, conducted by Richard Strauss. Briséïs is highly erotic and seductively scored music, which Strauss may well have remembered when he came to compose Salome.

The publication of the score in 1897 included a limited edition with a portrait by Desmoulins, tributes by several friends and composers (Bruneau, Charpentier, Chausson, D'Indy, Lamoureux, Messager and Mottl), as well as poems in Chabrier's memory by de Régnier, Saint-Pol-Roux, van Lerberghe and Viélé-Griffin.

Goldmark's opera  (1899) was originally to be called Briseis, although the subject matter is different.

Roles

Synopsis
Place: Corinth
Time: during Emperor Hadrian's reign.

Act 1Scene 1Hylas, in love with Briséïs, wishes to find fortune in Syria but pauses at the house where she lives with her sick mother Thanastô. As Briséïs appears, Hylas invokes Eros.Scene 2Briséïs and Hylas swear by Kypris [Aphrodite] to love each other until their last days. Briséïs insists that love must survive death into the tomb. Hylas leaves.Scene 3Thanastô implores God to save her to save the souls of the pagans around her, while regretting that her daughter does not share her Christian beliefs. Briséïs while fearful of the temptations facing Hylas vows to save her mother wracked by sickness and pain.Scene 4While the servants and Briséïs invoke the pagan gods, the Catechist arrives and prays for Thanastô, telling Briséïs that if she follows him her mother will be saved. Thanastô had promised her daughter to remain a virgin 'in eternity, a bride of God'. Briséïs submits and follows the Catechist.

Acts 2 & 3
(Shipwrecked on the spot where Briséïs has been baptized, Hylas reminds her of her vow to him. Briséïs kills herself and then calls upon Hylas to join her in the nuptial grave. After breathing the deadly scent of the flowers she offers him, he does, to the wonder of Christians and pagans.)

Recordings
Hyperion 1994: Joan Rodgers - Mark Padmore - Simon Keenlyside - Michael George - Kathryn Harries - conductor Jean Yves Ossonce. Chorus of Scottish Opera, BBC Scottish Symphony Orchestra (CDA66803) (recording of the UK premiere concert performance at the Usher Hall on 18 August 1994).

References
Notes

Sources

Delage, Roger, Emmanuel Chabrier. Paris: Fayard, 1999. 
Larner G. Chabrier - Briséïs, or Les amants de Corinthe (liner notes to CDA66803). London, Hyperion, 1995.
Loewenberg A. Annals of Opera.'' London, John Calder, 1978

French-language operas
1897 operas
Operas by Emmanuel Chabrier
Operas
Opera world premieres at the Berlin State Opera
Unfinished operas
Operas based on plays